Tian Carel Meyer (born 20 September 1988) is a South African rugby union player for the  in the Pro14 and the  in the Currie Cup. He plays mostly as a scrum-half and occasionally as a Wing.

He joined  in 2014 on a two-year contract.

He signed a contract to join Bloemfontein-based side  prior to the 2016 season on a two-year contract.

References

External links
 
 itsrugby.co.uk profile

1988 births
Living people
Afrikaner people
Cheetahs (rugby union) players
Free State Cheetahs players
Golden Lions players
Griquas (rugby union) players
Lions (United Rugby Championship) players
Pumas (Currie Cup) players
Rugby union players from Pietermaritzburg
Rugby union scrum-halves
Sharks (Currie Cup) players
Sharks (rugby union) players
South African rugby union players
NTT DoCoMo Red Hurricanes Osaka players
Urayasu D-Rocks players